The term Italian War can be used to refer to any of a number of conflicts:

 The Social War (91–87 BC)
 The Gothic War (535–554)
 The Italian Wars of  1494–1559
 The Italian Wars of Independence of 1848–1866
 The Italian Civil War of 1943–1945

See also
Italian Campaign (disambiguation)